Yasin Valley is a high altitude mountain valley in the Hindu Kush mountains, in the northern part of Gupis-Yasin District in the territory of Gilgit-Baltistan, Pakistan. The Yasin Tehsil is situated on its territory.

History 
Although sparsely populated, Yasin was of strategic importance because it leads to a high mountain pass to Yarkhun Valley and then to Broghil Pass in Chitral, connecting with the Wakhan Corridor of Afghanistan and Tajikistan.

Early period 
Yasin valley was administrative centre of Worshigum which remained under the suzerainty of Mehtars who emerged from Chitral. The Mehtars of Yasin were great warriors and fought against the Sikhs and the Dogras of Kashmir in Gilt agency. But more often, they fought with each other, intrigued and murdered each other. Eventually the British got tired of them and took control of the  territory in 1895 under the Gilgit Agency. By this time, Yasin was firmly recognised as part of the princely state of Jammu and Kashmir.

Yasin Mehtars 
 c.1780 - 1804 Mulk Aman               (died 1804)
 1804 - 1805 Kuwat Khan
 1805 - 1828/29 Sulayman Shah           (d. 1828/29)
 1829 - 1830/40 Mir Aman
 1841 - 1860 Ghauhar Aman (Gur Rahma)  (born 1809 - d. 1860)
 1860 - 1880 Ghulam Muhyiuddin
 c.1892 - 1911 `Abd ar-Rahman Khan (1st time)  (b. 1877 - d. 1948?)
 1911 - 1912 Qazi Maktum((Belongs to great family Qazizada's in Afghanistan))          (d. 1912)
 1912 - 1922 Qazi Gaznavid          (d. 1922)
 1923 - 19. `Abd ar-Rahman Khan (2nd time)  (s.a.).
  Raja Muhammad Wazir Khan 
  Raja Ghulam Muhyiuddin 2
  Gufran Atalegh from yasin after guhar aman the last governor of yasin

People 
The primary languages of Yasin Valley are Burushaski language and Khowar Language. Urdu is also widely understood.

The majority of the people in Yasin are Ismailis, who lead their lives according to the Islamic principles more concerned with the imam of the time. Currently Aga Khan IV is the imam and spiritual leader of the Ismailis. However, other branches of both as Sunni and Shia Islam also live in Yasin. Ethnically, the people of Yasin are of Burusho origin; however, there are some migrants from different parts of the country.

The people of Yasin are known for their honesty, hard work and bravery. Havaldar Lalak Jan Shaheed who was given the Pakistan Military's highest award Nishan-e-Haider for his bravery in Kargil War in 1999, belonged to Hundur in Yasin valley.

Geography 
Yasin is separated from the Ishkoman Valley by a high mountain pass. To reach Yasin one must take the Karakoram Highway north from Islamabad, and then turn left to reach Gupis in Ghizar. After Gupis, one continues northwest to reach the Yasin Valley.

The part of the valley where Khowar is spoken is known in the Shina language as Arinah.

Villages 
Administratively, Yasin constitutes Yasin Tehsil, which is part of Gupis-Yasin District. It is further divided into four local councils: Yasin, Sultanabad, Silgan and Thoi.
 Yasin consists of the villages of Chiliharang, Damalgan, Gindai, Noh, Morka, Atkash, Bujayot, Manichi, Thodass and Nazbar Valley. Thodass is the headquarters of this union council.
 Sultanabad union council consists of the villages of Chumarkhan, Taus, Barkhachi, Sultanabad (Met, Huyelti), Ghojalti, Sandi, Dalsandi and Qorqolti Valley. Taus is the headquarters of this union council.
 Selgaan union council consists of the villages of Barandass, Barkolti, Gulbashoroot, Chilpi, Sheghetan, Hundoor, Terchet, Umalsat and Darkut, which leads to the Pass to Boroghol. Hundoor is the headquarters of this union council.
 Thoi Valley union council consists of the villages of Ghaingchel, Ishkaibar, Karimabad, Dalkoi, Dapis, Shamsabad(Druch), Harp, Rahimabad, Kuno, Shot, Chiryat, Ishqamdass, Draskin, Nalti, Dass, Thelti, Ishqamghoro, Mahrakabun and Mushibarnala, which leads to Yarkhun Pass. Harp is the headquarters of this union council.

Passes 
The Darkut Pass connects Yasin with Wakhan and Chitral, height , Buroghul pass connect Yasin with Brughol, height  while the Thoi Pass connects Yasin to Yarkhun Chitral, height . Assumber pass connects Yasin to Ishkoman. Darkot Pass is an historical pass which has been labelled as a restricted zone by the government of Pakistan. This pass used to be the shortest means of communication between the Oxus and Indus. Most tourism is along the Assumbur Pass to the Ishkoman Valley. one pass is from Darkot yasin to Thoi. Attar pass height  Connects Darkut with Ishkoman Valley and Attar Lake. Three passes from Nazbar yasin connect to Mastuj Chitral, height , one pass from Bujayote Nala to Bawoshter Ghizat Shamaran, one other pass from Khaimet bar to Chitral (sources Aina e Dardistan By Hidayat ullah Akhter, edited by Javed sajid Sultanabad Yasin).

Gallery

References

External links 

Page of Yasin valley BABA E YASIN
 Yasin Valley
 WorldStatesmen - Pakistan - Princely states, with reigns
 Some Photos of Yasin Valley

Gupis-Yasin District
Valleys of Gilgit-Baltistan
Ismailism in Pakistan